Allan William Mulder (19 August 1928 – 7 November 2009) was an Australian politician. Born in Sydney, he was a systems operator with Sydney City Council before his election to Canterbury Municipal Council, of which he was Mayor in 1967. In 1972, he was elected to the Australian House of Representatives as the Labor member for Evans, defeating Liberal MP Malcolm Mackay. Mulder held the seat until his defeat in 1975.

References

Australian Labor Party members of the Parliament of Australia
Members of the Australian House of Representatives for Evans
Members of the Australian House of Representatives
1928 births
2009 deaths
20th-century Australian politicians
Mayors of Canterbury, New South Wales